Feast is a 2005 American action horror comedy  film directed by John Gulager, produced by Michael Leahy, Joel Soisson, Larry Tanz and Andrew Jameson. It was written by Patrick Melton and Marcus Dunstan and stars Balthazar Getty, Henry Rollins, Navi Rawat, Judah Friedlander, Jenny Wade, Gulager's father Clu Gulager, Josh Zuckerman and Jason Mewes. The story revolves around a group of people gathered inside a local bar in Nevada, where they are suddenly attacked by a horde of monstrous creatures.

Feast is a result of the amateur filmmaking documentary series and contest Project Greenlights third season. The winning team was composed of writers Dunstan and Melton and director Gulager. The executive producers were Ben Affleck, Matt Damon, Chris Moore (through their LivePlanet production company), Wes Craven and the Maloof family.

The film had a limited release in the United States on September 22, 2006, and premiered at the Chicago International Film Festival on April 14, 2005. Upon its release, it received generally mixed to negative reviews from critics, while some highly praised the cast performances as well as the story's humor. It grossed only $658 thousand against a production budget of $3 million.

Plot
As people are enjoying drinks in a bar, a man covered in blood—identified onscreen as "Hero" (Eric Dane)—enters through the door and warns them all of impending danger. No one heeds his warning, so he shows the bar patrons the head of a repulsive creature to make them take him seriously. He is soon pulled through a window and decapitated by one of the monsters. After the carnage, a woman—"Heroine" (Navi Rawat)—bursts through the door and reveals herself to be the recently deceased man's wife. After a brief sentimental moment between the wife and her late husband, the bar patrons begin boarding up the windows in the bar. Despite their efforts, a young monster bursts through an uncovered window and begins attacking. As a monster outside bursts its hand through "Vet" (Anthony "Treach" Criss), "Edgy Cat" (Jason Mewes) has his face torn off and is accidentally shot dead, and the little monster cuts off the leg of one of the women — "Harley Mom" (Diane Ayala Goldner)—who is initially assumed to have died from massive blood loss.

The monster disappears for some time, then is found attempting to sexually penetrate one of the deer heads nailed to the wall. A shotgun blast removes the deer head and monster. The monster drops into a freezer which is then sealed shut, trapping it inside. Following this, the remaining windows are boarded up and the bar patrons are given a moment of peace. Trying to call for help, they learn that the only phone in the bar has been hit by a stray shotgun blast and rendered useless. One of the women—"Tuffy" (Krista Allen)—suddenly realizes that her son Cody (Tyler Patrick Jones) is still upstairs and runs to get him. Once she finds her child the group rejoices until the boy is pulled through a window and eaten by one of the monsters, leaving only his right foot behind. Tuffy is incapacitated by grief, while the monster vomits a stream of slime at one of the group—"Beer Guy" (Judah Friedlander). As the remaining people regroup downstairs, they realize that the slime has a decomposing effect and that Beer Guy is being slowly overcome by its effects.

The group kills the young monster in the freezer and hangs it outside. The monster's parents quickly eat the child, have sex and produce two offspring in a matter of seconds, all of whom begin to attack the pub with renewed fury. Meanwhile, one of the women—"Honey Pie" (Jenny Wade)—begins washing off the blood and has to take off her clothes, much to the amusement of the others. The patrons regroup and enact various attempts to escape or drive off the monsters, including using Harley Mom's body as boobytrap while the Heroine and the "Coach" (Henry Rollins) attempt to escape. Upon discovering she's still alive, "Bossman" (Duane Whitaker) continues to prepare to sacrifice her to the creatures when she is suddenly grabbed by a baby monster that starts sexually assaulting her. The distraction fails, leading to the accidental death of the Heroine at the hands of another character, "Bozo" (Balthazar Getty). Driven by rage over the death of her child, Tuffy aggressively takes charge of the remaining survivors, which results in the audience seeing her nickname change from "Tuffy" to "Heroine 2". After "Coach" and "Bossman" are killed, "Honey Pie" successfully makes it to a truck, giving the other characters brief cause for hope (until they realize she is speeding off by herself).

A fight to the death between the last remaining humans and monsters ensues, resulting in the deaths of "Beer Guy" and supposedly the "Bartender" (Clu Gulager). Bozo, his brother Hot Wheels (Josh Zuckerman), and Tuffy (Heroine 2) survive, and drive off to retrieve the Heroine and Hero's daughter. One person—"Grandma" (Eileen Ryan)—is shown to still be alive within the bar but is attacked by one of the remaining monsters.

Cast

 Balthazar Getty as Bozo
 Krista Allen as Tuffy/Heroine 2
 Josh Zuckerman as Hot Wheels
 Navi Rawat as Heroine
 Jenny Wade as Honey Pie
 Henry Rollins as Coach
 Duane Whitaker as Bossman
 Clu Gulager as Bartender
 Judah Friedlander as Beer Guy
 Eileen Ryan as Grandma
 Jason Mewes as Edgy Cat/himself
 Diane Ayala Goldner as Harley Mom
 Anthony "Treach" Criss as Vet
 Eric Dane as Hero
 Tyler Patrick Jones as Cody

Reception

The site's critical consensus reads: "Director Gulager makes the most of what he's given; the resulting Feast offers up some surprisingly tasty -- if far from nourishing -- morsels".

On Metacritic, which assigns a normalized rating to reviews, the film has a weighted average score of 43 out of 100, based on 16 critics, indicating "mixed or average reviews".

Sequels

References

External links
 
 
 
 
 

2005 films
2005 horror films
American comedy horror films
2000s monster movies
2000s comedy horror films
American splatter films
Films directed by John Gulager
Dimension Films films
American monster movies
2005 directorial debut films
2005 comedy films
Films produced by Joel Soisson
2000s English-language films
2000s American films